Philip Henry Kerr, 11th Marquess of Lothian,  (18 April 1882 – 12 December 1940), known as Philip Kerr until 1930, was a British politician, diplomat and newspaper editor. He was private secretary to Prime Minister David Lloyd George between 1916 and 1921. After succeeding a cousin in the marquessate in 1930, he held minor office from 1931 to 1932 in the National Government, headed by Ramsay MacDonald.

In the late 1930s, he was a leading advocate of appeasement of Germany, emphasizing the harshness of the Treaty of Versailles and the dangers of Stalin's communism. From 1939 until his death, he was Ambassador to the United States. He proved highly successful in winning America's support for the British war effort, especially the Lend-Lease Act, which passed Congress after his death.

Background and education
Kerr was born in London as the eldest son of Major-General Lord Ralph Kerr, who was the third son of John Kerr, 7th Marquess of Lothian. His mother was Lady Anne Fitzalan-Howard, the daughter of Henry Fitzalan-Howard, 14th Duke of Norfolk, by the Honourable Augusta Mary Minna Catherine Lyons, the daughter of Vice-Admiral Edmund Lyons, 1st Baron Lyons.
 
Kerr was a nephew of Edmund FitzAlan-Howard, 1st Viscount FitzAlan of Derwent, and a great-nephew of Richard Lyons, 1st Viscount Lyons. Via his descent from the Lyons family, Kerr was a relative of Maine Swete Osmond Walrond (1870–1927), who was the Private Secretary to the Private Secretary to Lord Milner and a fellow member of Milner's Kindergarten.

Kerr was educated at The Oratory School, Birmingham, Cardinal Newman's foundation, from 1892 to 1900, and at New College, Oxford, where he took a First in Modern History in 1904, subsequent to which, in 1904, he tried unsuccessfully for a Prize Fellowship of All Souls College, Oxford. As an undergraduate, Kerr was known for his "androgynous" good looks and for being extremely narcissistic, leading him to be given the nickname "Narcissus" at Oxford. At Oxford, Kerr acquired a life-long love of golf, and a reputation as a charming intellectual who knew how to make appealing arguments.  Kerr had no interest in romantic relationships with women, and was generally assumed by those who knew him to be a repressed homosexual. The historian Michael Bloch wrote that it was very unlikely that the deeply religious Kerr ever engaged in homosexual relationships, but noted that he never married nor did he ever have a romantic relationship with a woman.

Public life
Kerr served in the South African government from 1905 to 1910 and was a member of what became called "Milner's Kindergarten", a group of colonial officers who deemed themselves reformist rather than an actual political faction. They believed the colonies should have more say in the Commonwealth of Nations. By the standards of the era, they were liberal: most of them had an interest in elevating the status of white colonials, rejected independence, and had a paternalistic view of nonwhites. Kerr became more liberal on these issues than his counterparts by admiring Gandhi and trying, if not entirely succeeding, to be more progressive than they were on racial issues.

Kerr was based in Johannesburg, where he served on the Inter-Colonial Council where he specialised in the running of the railroads. Kerr helped write the Selborne Memorandum of 1907 calling for the four colonies of the Transvaal, the Orange River Colony, Natal and the Cape Colony to be united into one and granted Dominion status as the new country of South Africa. In common with the other members of the Milner's Kindergarten, Kerr rejected the original British plan for the cultural genocide of the Afrikaners by forcing them to speak English regardless if they wanted to or not. Instead, he advocated reconciliation with the moderate Afrikaner nationalists led by Jan Smuts and Louis Botha. Kerr envisioned the new nation of South Africa as a federation where the Anglos (South African whites of British descent) would share power with the Afrikaners. The black and Asian populations of South Africa were completely excluded from the political progress-the moderate Afrikaner nationalists were prepared to allow "coloreds" (the South African term for mixed race people) the right to vote, a concession opposed by the more extreme Afrikaner nationalists. Inspired by The Federalist Papers that led to the modern American constitution, Kerr founded in December 1908 a journal called The States that was published in both English and Afrikaans that urged for the federation of the four colonies and Dominion status. Kerr defined the purpose of The States as allowing "...for the South Africans to join in a state and became a nation". However, the Afrikaners would not accept a federation and instead preferred an unitary state as the greater number of Afrikaners vs. the Anglos would ensure the former would dominate South Africa rather than the latter. On 31 May 1910, the Cape Colony, Natal, the Orange River Colony and the Transvaal were merged into the new nation of South Africa, which was granted Dominion status.

In September 1909, Kerr took part in the conference at Plas Newydd that led to the Round Table movement. He returned to England in 1910 to found and edit the Round Table Journal. At a meeting in London in January 1910, Kerr called for "an organic union to be brought about by the establishment of an imperial government constitutionally responsible to all the electors of the Empire, and with the power to act directly on individual citizens". In November 1910, Kerr became the first editor of The Round Table Journal, which attracted much attention with its plans to turn the empire into an imperial federation. In October 1911, Kerr suffered a nervous breakdown. During a visit to India in 1912, Kerr intensely studied the religions of the sub-continent such as Hinduism, which reflected his increasing disenchantment with Catholicism. After reading the book Science and Health with the Key to the Scriptures, Kerr converted to Christian Science. Kerr had contradictory impulses, combining what he considered to a "rational" approach to politics with a strong reverence for science together with a mystical, transcendent side of his personality that longed for something spiritual; the religion of Christian Science allowed him to combine his mysticism and belief in the supernatural together with his rationality and belief in science. In his article After Four Months of War that appeared in the December 1914 edition of The Round Table, Kerr called for "the voluntary federation of all free civilised states" as the best way to end war forever. In September 1915 edition of The Round Table in an article entitled The End of War, Kerr again called for a "world state" that would be a "a responsible and representative political authority" for the entire world as the best way to end the war. In June 1916 edition of The Round Table, Kerr in his article The principle of Peace, Kerr repeated his call for a "world state", saying the present international condition was "like that of the Western states of America in the early days...So long as independent behave like independent sovereign individuals, from time to time they will massacre each other in defense of what they believe to be their rights. And they will not cease from doing so until they agree to draw up laws which secure justice for all, to obey those laws themselves, and until the nations of the earth are willing to be united into a World State".

In December 1916, he was appointed David Lloyd George's private secretary and was active in the Paris Peace Conference. As the private secretary, Kerr continued with his plans for the peace. In a letter to Esme Howard, the British ambassador to Sweden, on 2 April 1918, Kerr stated the projected League of Nations should work towards world-wide disarmament and for a system of "public law" against "a world order based on the sword". As the right-hand man to Lloyd George, Kerr became well known in his own right. Lloyd George hated reading memos, and delegated the task to Kerr, who had then discussed whatever information he thought pertinent with the prime minister. Kerr came to be Lloyd George's "gatekeeper", deciding what information was passed on to the prime minister and who was allowed to see him, making him into a man of much power. Kerr was widely disliked within the British civil service as he was considered to be arrogant and sanctimonious. Kerr's religious beliefs led him to take the line that he was always acting from the highest moral principles, a belief that he was not shy in proclaiming, which gave him the reputation within the government circles as a prig. Lord Curzon referred to Kerr as the "second Foreign Office", Henry Wilson called Kerr a "poisonous" influence on Lloyd George while Maurice Hankey described Kerr as Lloyd George's "watch dog". The historians' Michael Dockrill and John Turner wrote: "It is difficult to determine precisely the impact of Kerr's advice on the course of British policy. But from the testimony of contemporaries, from Lloyd George's replies to Kerr's letters, and from the way that Kerr's recommendations found their way into policy documents and decisions, there can be no doubt that the prime minister listened carefully to Kerr's suggestions". Kerr played a prominent role in escalating the reparations demands on Germany. Initially, it was agreed that reparations would only go for direct war damages, which would have ensured the majority of reparations would go to France as most of northern France had turned into a wasteland. In an attempt to secure more reparations for Britain, Kerr supported Lloyd George's demands that German reparations also go to paying for all the pensions of the veterans, widows and orphans for the entire British empire, a demand that caused the breakdown on any sort of agreement on reparations. The draft version of the Treaty of Versailles spoke of compensation for German "invasions"; Kerr had the final version speak of German "aggression" as part of the British bid to secure more reparations at the expense of France.

On 18 February 1919, Kerr advised Lloyd George that the only way to persuade the French to drop their demand for severing the Rhineland from Germany would be for an Anglo-American commitment to defend France against renewed German aggression. Kerr was very strongly opposed to the French plans to separate the Rhineland from the Reich as "unreasonable", writing in a letter to Lloyd George on 3 March 1919 he favored peace "terms which gave the German people some hope and some independence". Ultimately, the French accepted the Rhineland would remain part of Germany in exchange for keeping the Rhineland demilitarised, under Allied occupation for 15 years (through the occupation actually ended in 1930) and a military alliance with Britain and the United States. However, the American Senate failed to ratify the alliance, which became moot as a result. Besides for the Rhineland issue, Kerr was highly concerned that the United States would not join the League of Nations as several senators felt the covenant of the league would threaten American sovereignty. To ensure the American Senate would vote to join the League of Nations, Kerr favored changing the covenant to address the concerns of the senate, advice that was not followed and led to the senate rejecting joining the League.

In March 1919, the proclamation of the Hungarian Soviet Republic led by Bela Kun in response to the Vix note shocked the British delegation, which became very concerned that harsh peace terms might led to the German Communists taking power. The British delegation saw Soviet Russia as its principal concern, which governed their attitude towards Germany. Lloyd George retired for a weekend to the Hotel d'Angleterre in the Paris suburb of Fontainebleau together with Kerr and his closest advisers to discuss what peace terms should be sought with the main fear being of having driving Germany towards Soviet Russia. In March 1919, Kerr was the man who typed up the Fontainebleau Memorandum setting out British goals at the peace conference. At the Paris peace conference, he befriended a member of the American delegation, the Assistant Navy Secretary and a rising star in the Democratic Party, Franklin D. Roosevelt, which later became an important factor in his career when Roosevelt was elected president in 1932.  He was appointed a Companion of Honour (CH) in March 1920. In March 1921, Kerr left Lloyd George's service to become the editor of The Daily Chronicle, a newspaper that Lloyd George had purchased in 1918. As editor, Kerr favored the Liberals in his leaders (editorials).

Kerr was a director of United Newspapers from 1921 to 1922 and secretary to the Rhodes Trust from 1925 to 1939. In August 1922, Kerr delivered three lectures at the Institute for Politics in Williamstown, Massachusetts entitled On the Prevention of War. In his lectures, Kerr repeated his favorite theme of a world federation as the best way to stop war, saying the division of the world into "absolutely separate sovereign states" was the "mechanical cause" of war. Kerr called for "the rule of law" to replace "the existing reign of violence" in world politics. Starting in 1923, Lothian came to feel that Germany had been "sinned against" with the Treaty of Versailles, and the entire treaty needed to be revised to the save the peace of the world. Kerr's moralism led him to become "obsessed" with the notion of Germany as a victim. On 30 October 1929, in a speech entitled Democracy, nationality and international unity that he delivered in Hamburg at the Institut für Außenpolitik, Kerr declared: "The wartime thesis that one nation was solely responsible for the war is clearly untrue". In the same speech, Kerr claimed the Treaty of Versailles was amoral because it was based on the "lie" that Germany started the war in 1914, which Kerr claimed was the work of many states. In March 1930 he succeeded his cousin as the 11th Marquess of Lothian and entered the House of Lords. In May of the following year he was made a Deputy Lieutenant of Midlothian. After the formation of the National Government in August 1931, Lothian was appointed Chancellor of the Duchy of Lancaster by Ramsay MacDonald. In November of the same year he became Under-Secretary of State for India, a post he held until 1932, when he was replaced by Rab Butler.

Lothian was a key driving force behind the National Trust Act of 1937, using his position in the House of Lords to argue in favour of amendments to the Trust. He advocated permitting individuals to bequest country homes and estates to the Trust allowing descendants to avoid death duties. This led to a huge expansion of country homes being obtained by the National Trust known as the Country Houses Scheme. On his death Lothian bequeathed his Norfolk country home Blickling Hall to the National Trust.

Enthusiast for Nazi Germany
Lothian believed that Germany had been treated unfairly and harshly by the Treaty of Versailles and, after its signing, he became a steadfast advocate of revising the Treaty in Germany's favour throughout the 1920s until March 1939, a policy known as appeasement. Claud Cockburn claimed Lothian was part of the Cliveden set of appeasers, and cartoonist David Low drew him as one of the "Shiver Sisters" dancing to Adolf Hitler's tune. For his commitment to appeasement, some called him "Lord Loathsome."

Speaking on 24 June 1933, at Gresham's School, Lothian said, "There probably never was a time of more uncertainty in the world than today. Every kind of political and economic philosophy is seeking approbation, and there is every kind of uncertainty about social and personal habits". The British historian Richard Griffiths made a distinction between appeasers, a term that he reserved for government officials who believed in appeasement of the Axis states for a variety of reasons, many quite pragmatic, and the enthusiasts for Nazi Germany, which he described a group of upper-class individuals who acting on their own as private citizens sought better relations with the Third Reich, usually for ideological reasons. Griffins defined Lothian as an enthusiast for Nazi Germany rather than an appeaser, noting his actions were undertaken as those of a private citizen who found much that was admirable about Nazi Germany.

Lothian as part of his anti-Versailles lobbying had come into contact in the 1920s with Dr. Margarete Gartner of the  Rheinische Frauenliga. Gartner was one of the leading promoters of the "Black Horror on the Rhine" story, which was intended to discredit both the Treaty of Versailles and France in particular. The "Black Horror on the Rhine" allegations-despite being mostly false-had done much to shift British sympathies away from France, which was accused of letting Senegalese soldiers engage in gross sexual violence against German women in the Rhineland, and towards Germany. Gartner continued to serve the new regime in Germany and in late 1933 she set up an Anglo-German Study Group, whose chairman was Lord Allen and which Lothian was a founding member. Through the study group, Lothian met Philip Conwell-Evans, a "rather shadowy" British historian who was to serve as his main contact with the Nazi regime. Lothian was close to the South African politician Jan Christian Smuts, and like Smuts he thought the Treaty of Versailles was too harsh while also tending to think in terms of the British empire rather than Britain. Like Smuts, Lothian was mainly concerned about the possibility of a German-Japanese alliance, which might bring down the British empire, leading Lothian to write: " We must prevent a Japanese-German combination, which will be fatal. And this can only be done by ceasing to treat Germany as a pariah in Europe". Through Lothian wrote in 1933 "like most Liberals, I loathe the Nazi regime", but also felt that "the first condition to reform it is that we should be willing to do justice to Germany". In a speech delivered in Nottingham on Armistice Day 1933 Lothian declared that "in part, at any rate, that [Nazi] regime is the product of our own conduct".

Lothian claimed that Nazi Germany did not want to "incorporate other races into itself.... [Nazism is a] national movement against internal disunity". He also claimed that the Franco-Soviet Treaty of Mutual Assistance was encircling Germany and that, deprived of an alliance with Austria-Hungary, the Polish corridor and many of its pre-1914 fortresses, Germany was weakened strategically and had good reason to pursue rearmament. Nazi repression of domestic enemies, Jews and Social Democrats, was in Lothian's view "largely the reflex of the external persecution to which Germans have been subjected since the war". He favoured a meeting between Hitler and the British Prime Minister Stanley Baldwin and for British policy to be less pro-French, and he claimed that the League of Nations could not be restored unless Germany was given "a square deal in Central Europe".

In January 1935, he went to Germany as the general secretary of the Rhodes Society, where he met Philip Conwell-Evans, a pro-Nazi British historian who lectured on German history at the University of Königsberg in Königsberg (modern Kaliningrad, Russia). Conwell-Evans was an associate of Joachim von Ribbentrop, the special Ambassador-At-Large, and through him Lothian met Ribbentrop. Through Ribbentrop, Lothian was able to meet Hitler on 19 January 1935 with Conwell-Evans serving as the translator.  Both Ribbentrop and the Deputy Fuhrer Rudolf Hess were also present at the Lothian-Hitler meeting, but as usually the case, both men said little, content to allow der Führer to do most of the talking. Lothian came away from meeting Hitler deeply impressed and stayed in close contact with both Ribbentrop and Conwell-Evans thereafter.  On returning to Britain after the first meeting, Lothian proclaimed: "Germany does not want war and is prepared to renounce it absolutely... provided she is given real equality". Lothian came to see his role as an unofficial diplomat who would work for better Anglo-German relations. Lothian was in contact with the Foreign Office, but in common with many other British enthusiasts for Nazi Germany felt that the professional diplomats of the Foreign Office were standing in the way of an Anglo-German rapprochement. Lothian was against demands that Britain boycott the 1936 Summer Olympics in Berlin, writing in a letter to The Times on 11 July 1935 that: "I do not believe that individual protests under existing circumstances will have any effect except to salve our own consciences". He argued that the British Olympic team should go to Berlin, writing that Germany had experienced a revolution and like "most revolutions it will now evolve, and it is essential that its evolution towards moderation should take place under British influences and the best way of ensuring that is to show that people in this country are interested in Germany and prepared to meet them on ordinary terms". Lothian was a member of the Anglo-German Fellowship, a group that existed to bring together the elites of Britain and Germany.

In a letter to Lord Allen, Lothian wrote: "Every time I see Ribbentrop, and every time I know anybody going to Nazi headquarters, I tell him to tell them that the present obstacle to better Anglo-German relations to-day is the persecution of the Christians, Jews and Liberal Pacifists". Lothian believed that revising the Treaty of Versailles would cause the Nazi regime to change its internal policies, arguing that Hitler was only acting the way he was because of the Treaty of Versailles had forced him to. In a 1936 letter to The Times, Lothain claimed that he "loathed all the dictatorships', writing that "Mussolini and the Pope are worst", followed up shortly by Stalin. In the same letter, Lothian wrote that Hitler "who is a visionary rather than a gangster", was the "least evil of the lot", and that "the Germans in themselves are much better people than the Italians and the Russians". Lothian concluded that Hitler was "one of the creative figures of this generation". The Foreign Office greatly resented the activities of Lothian and the other enthusiasts as unofficial diplomats, feeling that the actions of these people caused a great many problems, not the least because Hitler and Ribbentrop seemed to have much difficulty in understanding that the enthusiasts were not speaking for the British government.

After Germany militarised the Rhineland in March 1936, Lothian famously remarked that it was no more than the Germans walking into "their own back garden" and that he would not support sanctions against it. Lothian felt it was regrettable that Hitler had chosen to remiltarise the Rhineland illegally by violating both the Treaty of Versailles and the Treaty of Locarno, but argued that "one-sided demilitarisation" violated "the concession of equal rights to Germany". Lothian was opposed to the League of Nations opposing sanctions on Germany for the remilitarisation of the Rhineland. In a letter to his friend Smuts in March 1936 Lothian wrote all of the problems in Europe were caused by France, writing that since 1871 France had been trying to "humiliate and repress Germany" and that French "intransigence had been responsible for the rise of National Socialism". Lothian felt that Hitler should be allowed to develop "an Ottawa economic Mittel-Europa", but felt that neither France nor the Soviet Union would agree to a German-dominated economic zone in eastern Europe as he accused the French and the Soviets of seeking "a rigid encirclement of Germany". Lothian felt that Britain should pressure Paris and Moscow to change their polices by reverting to "the old policy of detachment from Europe", but expressed fears that Baldwin would not take such a radical step. Lothian felt that the diplomats of the Foreign Office were too pro-French to undertake the sort of foreign policy he favored towards Germany, an assessment shared by Smuts.

On 2 June 1936, Ribbentrop visited Sandwich, the home of the Conservative peer Lord Astor and his wife, the Conservative MP Nancy Astor. The other guests at Sandwich that day were Lothian, Tom Jones and Sir Thomas Inskip. During the visit, Ribbentrop, Jones and Lothian spent the night working on a long memo on ways to improve Anglo-German relations, which cast France as the main problem in European affairs. Ribbentrop did most of the talking while Lothian typed up the memo. The next day, Lothian sent the memo to the Foreign Secretary, Sir Anthony Eden, who does not seem to have been impressed. At an Anglo-German Fellowship dinner held on 14 July 1936 (a date picked deliberately to spite the French), Lothian in his speech called for the end of "the Versailles attitude of mind", through in the same speech he also admitted that the anti-Semitic policies of the Nazi regime gave Germany an image problem in Britain.

Again in May 1937, he travelled to Germany to meet Hitler with Conwell-Evans once more serving as the translator. At the second Lothian-Hitler meeting, Hitler was joined by his economic team, namely Hermann Göring, the chief of the Four Year Plan Organisation, and Hjalmar Schacht, the Economics Minister and the president of the Reichsbank. The second Lothian-Hitler meeting was dominated by economic issues. Both Göring and Schacht-who were also both fluent in English-supported Hitler's demand at the meeting for the return of Germany's former African colonies, claiming that the German economy could not function without a colonial empire in Africa as it was asserted that Germany needed its former African colonies to feed its people without exhausting its reserves of foreign exchange (Germany had more people than what German agriculture was capable of supporting, requiring the Reich to import food). At the beginning of the interview, Lothian reported that Hitler was "in a grave mood", but that after an hour "the atmosphere became considerably lighters and there were smiles all round". Lothian asked Hitler what were the causes of the "deterioration in relations from the German point of view", and received the reply the main issues were "Abyssinia, Spain and the colonial question". Hitler ended the interview by saying that "common sense would prevail and...the two peoples [German and English] racially alike with the finest qualities would not commit suicide by waging war against each other".

Lothian wrote after his second visit to Germany that the international situation was "both more dangerous and more soluble than I thought". Lothian came away convinced that Hitler's main demand was the return of Germany's lost colonial empire in Africa, which led him to conclude that Britain, France, Belgium and South Africa should return the former German colonies in Africa to the Reich. Lothian also believed that Hitler only wanted an anschluss with Austria, which he supported and wanted more rights for German minorities in Poland and Czechoslovakia. Lothian believed that Hitler did not want either the lands lost to Poland by the Treaty of Versailles and the Sudetenland, and only wanted better protection for German minorities in both Czechoslovakia and Poland, demands that Lothian felt were both reasonable and just. In his account of his second interview, Lothian wrote that Hitler had no interest "in dominating other nations, but only in securing Germany's own rights and place in the world". He also described National Socialism as a "fundamentally popular movement" and that "Hitler's power rests on popular support". In support of this thesis, Lothian cited the referendums held in the Third Reich where the Nazis always won 99% of the votes cast, accepting at face value Hitler's statement that the plebiscites were "the form of democracy appropriate to Germany".

In May, he wrote to Lloyd George: "If we join or drift into the anti-German group, we shall have world war. The only way to peace is justice for Germany [and] a German solution of the Austrian problem". A month later, he wrote to Foreign Secretary Anthony Eden: "Personally I believe that, if we assist Germany to escape from encirclement to a position of balance in Europe, there is a good chance of the 25 years of peace of which Hitler spoke". After meeting Hitler on a second occasion, Lothian wrote a memorandum to Neville Chamberlain:

I am sure that the idea that by strengthening the military combination against Germany and continuing relentlessly the economic pressure against her, the régime in Germany can be moderated or upset is an entire mistake.... The German people are determined by some means or other to recover their natural rights and position in the world equal to that of the great powers. If they feel driven to use force in power-diplomacy or war, they will do so with a terrifying strength, decision and vehemence. Moreover, because they are now beginning to think that England is the barrier in the way, they are already playing with the idea that... they may have to look for support... to Italy and Japan, if they are to achieve their aims.

At the 1937 Imperial Conference, Lothian strongly urged the Dominion prime ministers to oppose Britain giving any commitments in Europe. The member of the cabinet whom Lothian was closest to was Lord Halifax, who served as the Foreign Secretary between 1938 and 1940. By early 1938, Lothian had become convinced that "a momentum behind power politics which is becoming dangerous". Lothian felt that "a little more international vigour" was needed on the part of Britain and France, whose governments now needed to make clear "that there are conditions under which we are willing to face war", the totalitarian states would "begin to get out of hand".  From the spring of 1938 onward, the Foreign Secretary, Lord Halifax had considered appointing his friend Lothian to replace Ronald Lindsay, the retiring ambassador in Washington. The Permanent Undersecretary at the Foreign Office, Sir Alexander Cadogan, vehemently objected to Lothian as ambassador, saying the post should go to a professional diplomat rather than an "outsider", one who moreover had set himself up as an opponent of the Foreign Office with regard to Germany. Additionally, Lothian's most important political post had been as the right-hand man to Lloyd George, and there were concerns that "he had never a position of independent responsibility". However, the fact that Lothian as the general secretary of the Rhodes Trust had often visited the United States; had many American friends including President Roosevelt; and was well known as a proponent of closer Anglo-American ties led Halifax to override Cadogan's objections. Lindsay himself endorsed Lothian as his successor, writing to Halifax that Lothian was the best man to deal with the American media.

When Chamberlain visited Germany in September 1938 to meet Hitler to resolve the Sudetenland crisis, Lothian felt the initiative was "noble and heroic". Lothian wrote that "having gone as far as we have I’m inclined to think that rather than split the country and the democratic world by immediate concessions we ought to say that if Hitler invades Czechoslovakia it means war...We have, I think, strong cards in the long run and I think Hitler would hesitate. But if, having gone as far as we have in the last three weeks, we run away now and do something which is tantamount to "selling the pass" the prestige of the totalitarian methods and powers will be such, and the derision and depression of the democracies so acute, that it will go hard with the old British Empire." After Chamberlain signed the Munich Agreement with Hitler in 1938, Lothian expressed relief and said that Chamberlain had done "a marvellous job.... [he is] the only man who steadfastly refused to accept the view that Hitler and the Nazis were incorrigible and would understand nothing but the big stick". The German-born American historian Abraham Ascher wrote that anyone reading of the relationship between Lord Lothian together with the Canadian prime minister William Lyon Mackenzie King "cannot avoid being taken aback by the superficiality and gullibility of these two authors" as both Lord Lothian and Mackenzie King convinced themselves that Hitler was an idealistic man of peace.

In late 1938, Lothian read Mein Kampf, which led him to become disillusioned with Nazi Germany. At least part of the disillusionment was because in Mein Kampf, Hitler made it clear that his principal issue was not with the Treaty of Versailles, but rather with the Dolchstoß ("stab-in-the-back") that was alleged to have caused the German defeat in 1918. The implications of these views was Hitler was not angry with the alleged unjust Treaty of Versailles, but rather with the fact that Germany had lost the First World War, as he made it clear that only a German victory in 1918 would have satisficed him. Lothian was prepared to see the Treaty of Versailles revised in favor of Germany, but was he not willing to accept a German-dominated Europe, which he learned from Mein Kampf was what Hitler was seeking.

However, he later changed his mind after Hitler's violation of the Munich Agreement by the occupation of Czechoslovakia in March 1939. "Up until then it was possible", he wrote to a friend, Thomas William Lamont, on 29 March 1939, "to believe that Germany was only concerned with recovery of what might be called the normal rights of a great power, but it now seems clear that Hitler is in effect a fanatical gangster who will stop at nothing to beat down all possibility of resistance anywhere to his will". In a speech in the House of Lords in April 1939, Lothian spoke in favor of peacetime conscription, a first in British history as the only way to deter Germany from war.

Ambassador to the United States
In September 1939, Lothian was appointed Ambassador to the United States, a post he held until his death, the following year. He was sworn of the Privy Council in August 1939 and made a Knight of the Thistle in November 1940. Lothian played a central role in enlisting American support for economic aid to the British war effort. His change of view of Nazi intentions following the 1939 invasion of Czechoslovakia led him, as Ambassador to the United States, to seek a comprehensive program of aid for Britain. On 1 September 1939, Lothian arrived at the White House to present his credentials to President Roosevelt as His Britannic Majesty's Ambassador Extraordinary and Plenipotentiary to the United States of America. The ritual, which was normally a formality under which the new ambassador presents his credentials to the president who then accepts them, was overshadowed by the news that Germany invaded Poland earlier that day. Most of the meeting was taken up with the discussion of the crisis in Europe with Roosevelt telling Lothian that he sympathised with the Allies with "every fibre", but that he had to obey the neutrality laws passed by Congress or else face impeachment for violating the law.

Unlike Lindsay who chose to stay out of the limelight, Lothian aggressively sought media attention right from the moment he arrived in the United States. Lothian sought to engage in what he called "mutual education" by talking to the American media as much as possible, which won the disapproval of the Foreign Office, who felt that Lothian was debasing the office of an ambassador by acting like a salesman for an Anglo-American friendship. Lothian's various eccentricities and his sometimes erratic behavior also worried the Foreign Office. Lothian chose to engage in populist gestures and became a media star as the American historian Joseph Perisco noted that Lothian: "...grasped that Americans were much taken with bluebloods exhibiting a just-plain-folks demeanor. Thus, he wore a battered gray fedora, drove his own car, and bought his own train tickets when travelling in the United States." Lothian's sense of humor also appealed to Americans who liked an aristocrat who was not pompous or stuffy. One of Lothian's favorite jokes was to point out to American visitors a gigantic portrait of King George III that stood in the lobby of the embassy, saying this was the "founder of the American republic".

Upon his arrival in Washington D.C., Lothian accepted the advice of Robert "Van" Vansittart, the Chief Diplomatic Adviser, to accept the services of a British historian living in the United States, John Wheeler-Bennett, the "archetypal Anglo-American intellectual-an Oxford don and visiting lecturer at the University of Virginia equally at home at the High Table or pacing the battlefields of the American Civil War". Wheeler-Bennett who owned an estate in Virginia and wrote a weekly column in The Evening Standard become Lothian's principal adviser on American affairs. Wheeler-Bennett as a wealthy "gentleman of private means" was not an official employee of the British embassy, which proved to be a great advantage because as a private citizen Wheeler-Bennett was exempt from the rules forbidding embassy employees against openly lobbying to influence American public opinion. Wheeler-Bennett was Lothian's main contact man with the Fight for Freedom Committee. Though Wheeler-Bennett had doubts about Lothian's suitability as ambassador, but he discovered that Lothian tended to accept his advice that the best way to "sell" the British cause was by identifying it with the American values. To handle "black propaganda" in the United States, Lothian appointed a Canadian businessman William Stephenson to head the British Security Co-ordination group from his office in New York in order to provide some distance from the British embassy.

In late 1939, Lothian came into conflict with the First Lord of the Admiralty, Winston Churchill, whom he discovered had opened a correspondence with President Franklin D. Roosevelt, which Lothian objected to as undercutting his role. Lothian demanded that Churchill stop his correspondence with Roosevelt, and the dispute was mediated by the Foreign Secretary, Lord Halifax. Halifax declared in January 1940 that Churchill could continue his correspondence, but had to provide copies of the correspondence to Lothian to ensure that the ambassador was being "kept in the loop". In January 1940, Lothian faced his first crisis when the State Department submitted a note of protest to him against the British blockade of Germany as the Royal Navy stopped American merchantmen and tankers in the Atlantic on their way to Germany or to places where the supplies would be shipped on to the Reich. Jay Pierrepont Moffat, the head of the State Department's European Affairs Division, told Lothian that "there was a general feeling that the United States had been particularly friendly towards Great Britain, had even gone out of its way to give special forms of help, but that Great Britain has taken this friendship for granted". Lothian told Moffat that he "wanted to be of help" while a dispatch to Lord Halifax presented the issue as a matter of public relations, warning that the blockade was damaging Britain's image in the United States. Lothian wrote to Halifax that "we have to prove to the USA, which includes public opinion as well as the administration that any action we are taking is really necessary for the winning of the war". Lothian concluded: "The one fatal thing is for us to offer the United States advice as to what she ought to do. We have never listened to the advice of foreigners. Nor will the Americans". The issue was settled in February 1940 when Frank Ashton-Gwatkin of the Ministry of Economic Warfare was attached to the British embassy with orders to handle the American complaints against the blockade, which made it seem like the British were changing their polices when they were in fact not.

On 10 May 1940, Anglo-American relations were changed when Churchill became prime minister. The half-American Churchill put far more emphasis on Anglo-American relations than Chamberlain had ever done, and Lothian found himself heading what was now the most important British embassy in the world. Moffat recorded Lothian as saying: "He [Lothian] said that nine days out of ten Churchill was magnificent, but the tenth day during a crisis he was apt to lose his head, close his ears and refuse to listen to reason. Despite this weakness, Lothian felt he had the exuberance, drive and leadership which England craved". During the Norway campaign and the Dunkirk evacuation, a number of Royal Navy destroyers were either sunk by the Luftwaffe or badly damaged, putting them into the repairs yards for months. It was in late May 1940 that Lothian first suggested what became the destroyers-for-bases deal under which the Royal Navy would receive 50 aging American destroyers in exchange for the Royal Navy and the Royal Air Force giving up British naval and air bases in the British West Indies, Bermuda, British Guiana (modern Guyana) and Newfoundland to the US Navy and the United States Army Air Force on 99 year leases. Churchill was opposed to the destroyers-for-bases deal, arguing that Britain was giving up far more than what she was receiving. In response, Lothian argued that the deal would help resolve the Royal Navy's pressing shortage of destroyers and draw the United States closer to the United Kingdom by creating was in effect a joint Anglo-American defense of the New World with the US Navy and Army Air Force using British naval and air bases. Lothian also pointed out that the political advantage of the destroyers-for-bases deal, namely if the British were willing to give up their bases in the Caribbean Sea, Bermuda, and Newfoundland in exchange for 50 elderly destroyers, American public opinion might assume that further concessions from Britain would be granted in exchange for more military aid.

Churchill strongly disliked the destroyers-for-bases deal, feeling it was a one-sided transaction and the first step towards the United States taking over the British colonies in the New World, but the shortage of destroyers and the need to draw the United States deeper into a pro-Allied neutrality left him with no choice. In the summer of 1940, Churchill was very concerned about the prospect of a German conquest of Great Britain as the outcome of the on-going Battle of Britain was still undecided, and in the event of a German conquest, planned to make the Royal Navy to the New World to continue the struggle. In this regard, the American demand to take over British naval bases in the Americas was most troubling for Churchill. Lothian advised Churchill that his notion that Roosevelt would ask Congress for a declaration of war if he was reelected to a third term in November 1940 had no basis in fact, saying that at most Roosevelt would maintain a pro-Allied neutrality and that moreover Congress would not declare war on Germany simply because Roosevelt had submitted such a request.

In the summer of 1940, Lothian served as the main British negotiator for the destroyers-for-bases deal. Roosevelt was concerned that if he was seen as too generous with the British that if might hamper his chances of being reelected, and as result, the Americans drove a hard bargain, saying the American people would only support the deal if the British made all the concessions. Churchill told the Canadian prime William Lyon Mackenzie King: "We must be careful not to let the Americans view too complacently the prospect of a British collapse out of which they would get the British fleet and the guardianship of the British empire minus Great Britain". On 6 June 1940, Churchill in a dispatch to Washington told Lothian to tell Roosevelt that his government would not sign an armistice with Germany and to warn Roosevelt that if the Reich conquered the United Kingdom, a "Quisling government" would be installed in London that would hand over the Royal Navy's ships to Germany. Churchill later wrote of Lothian: "Airey, light, aloof, dignified, censorious, yet in a light and gay manner, Lothian had always been good company. Now, under the same hammer that smote us all, I found an earnest, deeply-stirred man. He was primed with every aspect and detail of the American attitude. He won nothing, but goodwill and confidence in Washington by his handling of the Destroyers-for-Bases negotiations. He was fresh from intimate contact with the president, with whom he had established a warm personal friendship".

In his speeches to the American people, Lothian portrayed Nazi Germany as a ruthless power bent upon world domination, and to ease American discomfort at British imperialism, noted that the British Empire was evolving into the Commonwealth. Lothian made point of emphasizing that members of the Commonwealth were under not British control, giving the example of Ireland which had declared neutrality, and stated that nations such as Australia, New Zealand, South Africa and Canada were at war because they had chosen to enter the war. About the charge that India and the rest of the British colonies around the world had no say in whatever they wanted to be involved in the war, Lothian stated these colonies would be granted Dominion status in due course once they were "ready". The fact that Lothian had been an advocate of granting Dominion status to India made him sound credible on this issue to American audiences, through Churchill had no intention of ever granting India Dominion status. Finally, Lothian depicted democracy as a special value of the English-speaking peoples, claiming that democracy had been born in ancient Athens, nourished in Rome, developed into maturity in Britain and had finally reached perfection in the United States. In a ceremony performed at the Library of Congress, Lothian placed one of the first versions of the Magna Carta produced in 1215 at the library as a gift from the people of Britain to the people of the United States to illustrate their common democratic heritage. In his speech, Lothian declared that he placed this copy of the Magna Carta "alongside its own descendants, the Declaration of Independence and the American constitution". Lothian was greatly influenced by the navalist theories of the American historian Alfred Thayer Mahan put forward in his 1890 book The Influence of Sea Power Upon History, and he frequently cited Mahan's thesis that whatever power was the greatest sea power was also the world's greatest power. Lothian claimed that the United States had benefitted from the Pax Britannica of the 19th century as he maintained that the Royal Navy had protected the United States just as much as the United Kingdom during the "short 19th century" of 1815–1914. Using Mahan's theories as his basis, Lothian claimed that a Germany that dominated the seas would inevitably come into conflict with the United States, and thereby reversed the arguments of American isolationists by claiming the best way to keep the United States out of the war was by aiding Britain. Lothian claimed that as long as Britain dominated the seas, there was no prospect of a German-American war, thereby making aiding Britain the best way of the United States to avoid entering the war.

In a speech in Chicago, Lothian stated that the Royal Navy was the United States' "first line of defense", saying that as long the Royal Navy ruled the seas there was no danger of a German invasion of anywhere in the New World. Lothian noted that Germany had emerged as a major economic competitor to the United States in Latin America, and argued that if Britain were defeated, then the Monroe Doctrine would become moot as he envisioned a future where the Kriegsmarine ruled the Atlantic, allowing the Reich to project power anywhere it wanted in Latin America. Lothian's choice of Chicago to deliver this speech was no accident. The American Midwest was a stronghold of isolationism, and Lothian chose Chicago as a way to reach an audience that was particularly opposed to American aid to Britain. Cadogan and the other professional diplomats at the Foreign Office objected to the Chicago speech, saying that speeches like the one he delivered in Chicago would led to charges of British inference in the American presidential election. Lothian in response wrote that his speeches "have been a success here precisely because I have felt that I knew the American mind well enough to be quite frank and to deal frankly with controversial issues. I can imagine what my speeches would have been like if they had been minuted by all the veterans of the Foreign Office at home!" In an article in Time, Lothian's Chicgo speech was described as "one of the most effective, skillful briefs yet delivered for the Allied cause. It was the sort of talk which earns Britain a reputation for fair dealing and open-minded thinking". In a speech to the graduating class at Yale University on 19 June 1940, Lothian stated: "The outcome of the grim struggle will affect you almost as much at it affects us. For if Hitler gets our fleet or destroys it, the whole foundation on which the security of both our countries has rested for 120 years will have disappeared".

On 19 July 1940, Hitler in a speech put out peace feelers to Britain. Without seeking permission from the British government, Lothian asked Malcolm Lovell, an American Quaker in touch with the Germans, to inquire what terms were on offer to "a proud and unconquered nation". However, on 22 July, Foreign Secretary Lord Halifax delivered a speech rejecting the offer. Harold Nicolson wrote in his diary, "Lothian claims that he knows the peace terms and they are most satisfactory. I am glad to say that Halifax pays no attention to this".

From 1937 onward, Britain had leaned in a pro-Chinese neutrality with regard to the Second Sino-Japanese War. In July 1940, when the Japanese submitted an ultimatum demanding that the British close the Burma Road under which arms were carried from India to China, Lothian supported accepting the Japanese demand. Churchill accepted the Japanese ultimatum and had the Burma road closed, through the British re-opened the Burma Road in October 1940.  For a time, Lothian favored making an agreement with Japan under which Britain would recognize China as being within the Japanese sphere of influence and agree to supply Japan with oil in exchange for a Japanese promise not to align any more closer with Germany and Italy. Lothian had a reputation for being mercurial and changing his mind in accord with his mood. During a dinner party at the British embassy on 18 July 1940 with Treasury Secretary Henry Morgenthau Jr. and the War Secretary Henry L. Stimson, Lothian became involved in a violent debate with the American guests criticising the British for closing the Burma road, leading Lothian to snap back that the Americans had offered Britain no support when the Japanese ultimatum arrived and that furthermore that 80% of all the oil used in Japan came from the United States, saying it was American oil companies who were supporting the Japanese war machine. Lothian stated that Japan had no oil, and if the Americans wanted to they could easily paralyze the Japanese economy with an oil embargo. Lothian then proposed that the United States together with Britain impose a total oil embargo on Japan, and that the British would blow up the oil wells in the Netherlands East Indies (modern Indonesia) to prevent the Japanese from seizing them. Lothian finally dared his American guests to actually do what he had just suggested, saying here was a way to stop Japan.

Morgenthau was much taken with the idea, through Lothian had only made this suggestion in a moment of anger, and the next day advised Roosevelt that the United States should impose an oil embargo on Japan. Through Roosevelt rejected the idea of an oil embargo for the time being following advice from the State Department that the Japanese might very well react to an oil embargo by invading the Netherlands East Indies to seize the oil wells, this was the origin of the oil embargo that the United States, the United Kingdom and the Dutch government-in-exile were to impose on Japan on 26 July 1941. In his report to London, Lothian mentioned he discussed the idea of an oil embargo on Japan, through he notably failed to mention it was he who brought up the idea, giving the highly misleading impression that it was Stimson and Morgenthau who first suggested an oil embargo. Churchill when he read the dispatch called the idea of an oil embargo on Japan "madness". Through Lothian tried to back away from an idea he himself had first floated, but his unwillingness to have British policy became too far removed from American policy made his resistance half-hearted. With regard to Japan, British policy was torn between a belief that being too confrontational would lead to the Japanese seizing the British colonies in Asia vs. a fear that being out of sync with American policy would cause tensions in Anglo-American relations at a time when Britain desperately needed the help of the United States against Germany.

On 22 July 1940, Lothian advised the prime minister Winston Churchill that now was the best time to resume contacts with Roosevelt about the possibility of the United States supplying Britain with 50 destroyers. The American ambassador in London, Joseph P. Kennedy Sr., had advised Churchill against making "emotional blackmail" against Roosevelt-a warning taken seriously given that Kennedy was a close friend of the president. As a result of Kennedy's warnings, Churchill had not been in contact with Roosevelt for the last six weeks. On 25 July 1940, Lothian received a copy of an Admiralty memo stating that the Royal Navy had a total of 176 destroyers operating around the world. The same memo stated that the Royal Navy had a total of 68 destroyers operating at any given moment in British home waters while there was only the prospect of 10 new destroyers coming out of British shipyards in the next four months, leaving the Royal Navy unable to cope with the U-boat attacks in the home waters owing to a shortage of destroyers. Britain had far more people than what British agriculture was capable of supplying, requiring Britain to import food on a massive scale to feed its people while the United Kingdom also needed to import oil to keep its economy and military functioning. If the U-boats sunk enough merchantmen and tankers, then the British economy would be severely damaged; the Royal Air Force, the Royal Navy and much of the British Army would rendered ineffective; and finally a famine that would kill millions would almost certainly force Britain to surrender.

Lothian who cultivated the American media intensely during his ambassadorship leaked the memo to a number of his American friends such as Henry Luce and Norman Davies, in order to give the Royal Navy's destroyer shortage maximum coverage in the American media. Lothian was disobeying orders in leaking the memo, and to cover his tracks, Lothian asked the American media not to use the precise figure of 68 destroyers, instead asking them to print that the Royal Navy had only 60-70 destroyers in home waters. Before Lothian leaked the memo, American newspapers usually claimed that the Royal Navy had between 150 and 200 destroyers in the home waters, and the revelation of the destroyer shortage was used by American advocates of aid to Britain as an example of how the United States could aid the United Kingdom by supplying more destroyers. On 30 July 1940, Lothian advised Churchill to disregard Kennedy's warnings, writing: "Strong pressure is being brought on the president to reconsider the possibility of supplying us with destroyers. Now is the moment to send him a most moving statement of our needs and dangers in respect of destroyers and flying boats that you can, if you have not already done so". Lothian's use of the American media helped prepare the way for the Destroyers for Bases deal of 2 September 1940 under which the United States supplied destroyers in exchange for leases on British bases in the New World. By the fall of 1940, the State Department had come to prefer Lothian's views over those of Kennedy who reported to Roosevelt that Britain would soon be defeated. Moffat wrote: "If Kennedy says something is black and Lothian says it is white, we believe Lord Lothian".

During a trip home to Britain in October 1940, he urged Churchill to make Britain's situation plain to Roosevelt, in the hope that a letter doing so would force the latter into action to help Britain, in order to ensure the future security of the United States.  Returning to New York on 23 November 1940, he told the assembled journalists: "Well, boys, Britain's broke; it's your money we want". The near-bankruptcy of the United Kingdom had been a closely guarded secret, and Lothian went well beyond Prime Minister Winston Churchill's instructions in divulging it.  The remarks caused a sudden drop in confidence in sterling and were exploited by German propaganda. Lothian's statement helped force President Franklin Roosevelt's hand in responding to British appeals by proposing the Lend-Lease Program to aid Britain. He initiated the joint Anglo-American military organisation of the Combined Chiefs of Staff.

Personal life and death
The Kerr family had been brought up in the Roman Catholic Church: his grandmother was a noted convert. Kerr himself considered becoming a priest or monastic at times, but in adulthood he became disillusioned with the faith. His close friendship with Nancy Astor led to their both converting to the Church of Christ, Scientist together. Devoted to the very end to the religion to which he had converted, he died in Washington, D.C. in December 1940, aged 58, having refused medical treatment as a Christian Scientist.

His remains were cremated, but with the Battle of the Atlantic making sea travel risky and air travel limited to only items of the highest importance, the United Kingdom agreed that Lord Lothian's ashes should remain in the United States until such time as they might be safely conveyed across the Atlantic.  His ashes were interred in the Maine Mast Memorial at Arlington National Cemetery on 15 December 1940, after a funeral at the Washington National Cathedral. Lord Lothian's ashes were returned to the United Kingdom aboard an American naval vessel in December 1945.

He never married and left no heirs, so the marquessate was inherited by his first cousin, Peter Kerr. He bequeathed Blickling Hall to the National Trust.

References

Further reading

 Billington Jr, David P. Lothian Philip Kerr and the Quest for World Order (2006)

 Bosco, A. and A. May, eds. The Round Table movement, the Empire/Commonwealth and British foreign policy (1997) ·
 Butler, J.R.M. Lord Lothian (Philip Kerr) 1882-1940 (St. Martin's Press 1960), ASIN: B0007ITY2A
Cowling, Maurice, The Impact of Hitler – British Policies and Policy 1933–1940, (Cambridge UP, 1975), p. 411, 

 Jeffreys-Jones, Rhodri. "Lord Lothian and American Democracy: An Illusion in Pursuit of an Illusion." Canadian Review of American Studies 17.4 (1986): 411–422.

 May, Alex. "Kerr, Philip Henry, eleventh marquess of Lothian (1882–1940)", Oxford Dictionary of National Biography, Oxford University Press, 2004; online edn, Jan 2011 online

 Roberts, Priscilla. "Lord Lothian and the Atlantic world."  Historian 66.1 (2004): 97-127 online.
 Roberts, Priscilla. Lord Lothian and Anglo-American Relations, 1900-1940 (2009)

Primary sources
 J. Pinder and A. Bosco, eds. Pacifism is not enough: collected lectures and speeches of Lord Lothian (1990),

External links
Round Table Movement – Past and Future, 1913
Papers relating to the application of the principle of DYARCHY T0 THE GOVERNMENT OF INDIA, 1920
 

1882 births
1940 deaths
People educated at The Oratory School
Alumni of New College, Oxford
Chancellors of the Duchy of Lancaster
Editors of the Round Table Journal
Members of the Order of the Companions of Honour
Knights of the Thistle
Members of the Privy Council of the United Kingdom
Liberal Party (UK) hereditary peers
Diplomatic peers
English Christian Scientists
Ambassadors of the United Kingdom to the United States
Politicians from London
Deputy Lieutenants of Midlothian
Marquesses of Lothian
Converts to Christian Science from Roman Catholicism
British Christian Scientists